Henry Edison McDaniel (October 2, 1906 − March 2, 2008) was a watercolor artist of landscapes, trout and salmon fishing scenes.

Biography 
McDaniel was born in Annapolis Royal, Nova Scotia (2 October 1906) and died in Quincy, Massachusetts (2 March 2008). He emigrated at age 19 from Bridgewater, Nova Scotia to Boston, Massachusetts, where he studied at the Vesper George School of Art (1925-1927) with Vesper George, Prescott Jones, William Hazelton and Frank Waldo Murray.

McDaniel earned his living in advertising. He was art director of four Boston agencies, Bennett and Northrup, Inc.; Norman-Buffet Display Industries,Inc.; Vose Swain Inc. and Bowne of Boston,Inc..

He developed his skills with watercolor in his leisure time beginning in the 1930s and painted en plein air for 20 years before he began his studio art in the 1950s. His first one-man exhibit (1940) consisted of Nova Scotian scenes at The Boston City Club Gallery. McDaniel stopped painting at age 100 after completing over 500 works, most of which are in private collections; some are in museums and corporate offices. His fine art work and articles by or about him have appeared in 27 publications from 1936-2010.

McDaniel's first print, "Fishing the Dry on the Upper Connecticut", was a limited edition made at Royal Smeets Offset Printers in Weert, Netherlands in 1973 for the members of The Anglers' Club of New York. His painting hangs at the club with the art of Winslow Homer and Ogden Pleissner. His print "Morning on Taylor Shore"  was presented to Charles, Prince of Wales in 1978 at the International Atlantic Salmon Foundation Symposium, London, England. It was produced by the International Atlantic Salmon Foundation and the Crossroads of Sports, Inc. in 1976. A later print, "Miramichi Morning", was produced in 1989 by the Atlantic Salmon Federation for its members. For this painting, McDaniel was named artist of the year by the ASF.

Henry McDaniel's art and illustrations were used in two books: "The Art of the Atlantic Salmon Fly" by Joseph D Bates, Jr. (1987), published by David R Godine, Boston, MA. and "The Compleat Lee Wulff" by Lee Wulff (1989), published by Truman Talley Books, E. P. Dutton, Ny, NY.

Philosophy 
Like artists of the Hudson River School, McDaniel painted streams, seascapes and landscapes as an outpouring of his passion for place and to promote conservation. Yet, McDaniel was determined not to stage or sentimentalize his art, often choosing unconventional subjects such as "Bush Island Castaways" and "Memories of Blue Rocks". He was influenced by Ogden Pleissner, Winslow Homer and Aiden Lassell Ripley. His paintings are representational and notable for realistic water and light effects. As he was a skilled and avid fisherman, he painted trout and salmon scenes with authentic detail. Most of his fishing scenes are set in New England and Maritime Canada.

Memberships 
1951   Boston Watercolor Society
1953   The Guild of Boston Artists
1988   The Hudson Valley Art Association

Museums 
The Holyoke Museum of Art, Holyoke, Massachusetts
American Museum of Fly Fishing, Manchester, Vermont
Miramichi Salmon Museum, Doaktown, New Brunswick, Canada

Awards and honors
1950s  Several awards for Excellence at the Boston Guild of Watercolor Society Painters exhibits, Boston Museum of Fine Arts, Boston, Massachusetts.
1958   B.L. Makepeace award for "Approaching Shower" at the Boston Society of Watercolor Painters exhibit,  Boston Museum of Fine Arts.
1960   Richard Mitton medal for " Waitsfield, Vermont" most popular in Class D.
1964   Richard Mitton medal for "Road to the Sea" most popular in Class D.
1966   Richard Mitton medal for "Down East Memories" most popular in Class D.

The Richard Mitton medals were given at the Annual Exhibit of Paintings by Contemporary Artists of New England at the Jordan Marsh galleries in Boston, Massachusetts.

1973   The Angler's Club of New York selected  "Fishing the Dry on the Upper Connecticut" for their gallery and to be used for prints for their members.
1988   First Place at The State of Maine Wildlife Art Show.
1989   Third Place at the State of Maine Wildlife Art Show.
1989   Artist of the Year, The Atlantic Salmon Federation, Montreal, Canada, for his "MIramichi Morning" made into a print for ASF members.
1991   New England Watercolor Society prize, annual Grumbacher Show, Guild of Boston Artists.
1993   Hall of Fame Inductee Miramichi Salmon Museum, Doaktown, New Brunswick, Canada.

Exhibits 
1940   Boston City Club Gallery, a one-man show of Nova Scotian scenes.
1949, 1955, 1957   National Academy Galleries, 5th Ave. N.Y. American Watercolor Society.
1958,1972   Scituate Arts Festival, Scituate, Massachusetts.
1963   7th Annual Eastern States Art Exhibit, Springfield, Massachusetts.
1955−1959 An Exhibition of Paintings from the Ford Times Collection of American Art, "Artists and Fishermen", Ford Motor Company and New England Journeys Exhibits toured New England museums, art galleries and libraries.
1940-1973   Contemporary New England Artists exhibits at Jordan Marsh Company Gallery, Boston, Massachusetts, 22 shows.
1940−1975   Boston Society of Watercolor Painters exhibits: Vose Galleries in 1950, Boston Museum of Fine Arts 1951-1973, Boston Center for the Arts 1974 and 1975, 23 shows.
1955 and on   Guild of Boston Artists, Boston, South Braintree and Lexington, Massachusetts.
1979   Thomas Crane Public Library, Quincy, Massachusetts, a one-man show; also 1976.
1973   The Angler's Club of New York, New York City.
1975   Arlington Art Association, Arlington, Massachusetts.
1979   Soaring Wings Gallery, Eugene, Oregon.
1985, 1986   Atlantic Salmon Federation Conclaves, Corner Brook, Newfoundland, Canada.
1987−1989   Atlantic Salmon Federation Dinners, Montreal, Quebec, Canada.
1990   Hudson Valley Art Show, Westchester County Center, White Plains, New York.
1990   The Miramichi Salmon Museum Art Festival, Doaktown, New Brunswick, Canada.
1993   Atlantic Salmon Federation show at L.L. Bean, Freeport, Maine.
2010   Petite Riviere, Nova Scotia, Canada, a one-man retrospective exhibit of his paintings of Lunenburg County, Nova Scotia accompanied by a lecture on the paintings by Brian Oickle, Toronto MFA.

Publications 
1936   National Sportsman May vol. LXXV, no. 5, cover painting.
1937   National Sportsman April vol. LXXVII, no. 4, cover painting.
1954   Lincoln-Mercury Times March–April published by the Ford Motor Company, Dearborn, Michigan "Song of the Margaree" story and paintings by Henry McDaniel pgs. 1-4.
1955   Ford Times May published by Ford Motor Company "Big Trout in Vermont Streams" story and paintings by Henry McDaniel pgs. 2-5.
1957   Ford Times March published by Ford Motor Company "Nova Scotia's Little Rivers" story and paintings by Henry McDaniel pgs. 2-7
1957   Ford Times July published by Ford Motor Company "Quebec's Roadside River for Salmon" by Peter Barrett, paintings by Henry McDaniel pgs. 28-33.
1959   Ford Times June published by Ford Motor Company "St. Mary's River for Salmon" story and paintings by Henry McDaniel pgs. 2-5.
1960   Ford Times June published by Ford Motor Company "Connecticut River Trout Pools" by Corey Ford, paintings by Henry McDaniel pgs. 2-7.
1961   Ford Times September published by Ford Motor Company " River of Distinction" by Jeff Rawlings, paintings by Henry McDaniel pgs. 31-33.
1962   Ford Times published by Ford Motor Company "The Water is Always Bluer" by Robert G. Deindorfer, paintings by Henry McDaniel pgs. 61-63.
1974   Sports Afield magazine February painting by Henry McDaniel pg. 36.
1976   Gray's Sporting Journal Spring vol. 1, no. 2 cover painting by Henry McDaniel.
1984   Gray's Sporting Journal Summer vol. 9, issue 2 inside cover painting by Henry McDaniel.
1985   Atlantic Salmon Journal Summer vol. XXXIV, no. 2 "A Brush With Adventure: the sporting art of Henry McDaniel" by Spence Conley pgs. 36-39, 41.
1986   Spawner Sport Fishing Annual cover painting by Henry McDaniel.
1987   Landmarks, Ontario's Natural Resources Magazine painting by Henry McDaniel pg. 9.
1987   The Fishers Forum December "The FlyFisher's Artist - Henry McDaniel" by Tom McMillan pgs. 1, 12, 13.
1987   Book "The Art of the Atlantic Salmon Fly" by Joseph D. Bates, Jr. published by David R. Godine, Boston, Massachusetts "The Return" and line drawings by Henry McDaniel.
1989   Atlantic Salmon Journal Autumn vol. XXXVIII, no. 3 painting by Henry McDaniel pg. 16.
1989   Book "The Compleat Lee Wulff" by Lee Wulff published by Truman Talley Books, E.P.Dutton, N.Y., N.Y. cover painting and illustrations by Henry McDaniel.
1990   Fishing Collectibles Magazine Fall vol. 2, no. 2 cover painting by Henry McDaniel.
1992   Fly Rod and Reel April "Profile: Henry McDaniel" by Spence Conley pgs. 29-30, 84-86.
2003   Art of Angling Journal vol. 2 issue 2 "A Brush With Immortality in the Art of Henry McDaniel" by Douglas Marchant cover and pgs. 4, 26-64.
2004   The Magazine Antiques July "Fishing in the Rapids" a painting by Henry McDaniel attributed falsely to John Whorf by Avery Galleries. Haverford, Pennsylvania.
2005   Atlantic Salmon Journal Spring vol. 54, no. 1 cover "Unnamed Pool" painting by Henry McDaniel attributed falsely to John Whorf.
2005   Atlantic Salmon Journal Summer vol.54, no. 2 "Stealing Henry's Name" pgs. 60-65 and "The Henry McDaniel Affair" pg. 4 both by Martin Silverstone, editor.
2005   IFAR International Foundation for Art ResearchJournal vol. 8, no. 1 "The Painting is Real, The Name is Not" by Sharon Flescher painting by Henry McDaniel pgs. 4-5.
2008   Atlantic Salmon Journal vol. 57, no. 2 "Perfect Water" by Martin Silverstone, "The Return" painting by Henry McDaniel (1906-2008).
2009   Photographic book, "A Celebration of Henry McDaniel", 208 paintings reproduced, privately published by Joseph W McDaniel.

References 

 

 
Ford Times        
Ogden Pleissner 
Winslow Homer  
Lee Wulff            
Hudson River School 
The Guild of Boston Artists

External links 
 [IFAR] International Federation for Art Research  www.ifar.org
John Whorf - two of Henry McDaniel's paintings, here at auction under the name of John Whorf,
 "Unnamed Pool" and "Fishing the White River".
http://henrymcdaniel.com/

20th-century American painters
American male painters
21st-century American painters
21st-century American male artists
Artists from Boston
Landscape paintings
Realist painters
20th-century Canadian painters
Canadian male painters
Artists from Nova Scotia
People from Annapolis County, Nova Scotia
1906 births
2008 deaths
20th-century American male artists
20th-century Canadian male artists